Sanaz Toossi is an American playwright and screenwriter.

Life and career
Of Iranian descent, Toossi is from Orange County, California; her mother emigrated to the United States after the Iranian Revolution. She is an only child, and grew up a self-described "weird theatre kid". She graduated from the Tisch School of the Arts in 2018, having previously received her bachelor's degree from the University of California, Santa Barbara. Her plays are drawn from personal experience, and the experiences of her family. Her play English received the Lucille Lortel Award for Outstanding Play in 2022. In 2022 she received the Horton Foote Award from the Dramatists Guild of America.

Works

As playwright
English (2022)
Wish You Were Here (2022)

As screenwriter

5 Women
A League of Their Own
Invitation to a Bonfire

References

Year of birth missing (living people)
Living people
American writers of Iranian descent
21st-century American dramatists and playwrights
21st-century American screenwriters
American women dramatists and playwrights
American women television writers
21st-century American women writers
People from Orange County, California
Screenwriters from California
University of California, Santa Barbara alumni
Tisch School of the Arts alumni